Nick Dioguardi (October 12, 1932 – May 11, 2015) was a racing driver born in Alia, Italy, based in Glendale, California. Throughout his career Dioguardi made a single IndyCar start in 1970.

Racing career
Dioguardi first appeared on the national racing series at the 1965 SCCA National Championship Runoffs. At Daytona International Speedway Dioguardi ran a Brabham in the Formula SCCA race. Dioguardi started 21st but failed to finish the race running in ninth place. The following year, at Riverside International Raceway, he finished in first place beating Phil Groggins. In 1969 Dioguardi, at the Riverside Grand Prix, his Lotus Formula C struck a photographer. The photographer survived the impact suffering a broken leg.

As of 1968 Dioguardi also ran in Formula A. Both times, in 1968 and 1969, he failed to finish the race. Dioguardi first ran a World Racing Enterprises Shadow in 1968 and a Surtees TS5 the following year. In 1969 Dioguardi also entered the Continental 49'er at Sears Point Raceway. He finished in fifteenth place in the fourth round of the 1969 SCCA Continental Championship. In 1971 Dioguardi ran the complete season in the Surtees. Sponsored by Delta Tire Dioguardi scored a single point. At the Mid-Ohio Grand Prix he finished in tenth place.

Dioguardi made two appearances in IndyCar. In 1969 he was entered by Arciero Racing in an Eisert 64. The car built to Formula A specifications failed to qualify at Riverside. The following year Dioguardi returned, at Phoenix International Raceway. He qualified 24th, and last. After 28 of the Phoenix 150 Dioguardi crashed.

He later made appearances in Can-Am. In 1972 Dioguardi ran at Laguna Seca and Riverside. He ran a Titanium Ti22. The car was revolutionary when it was introduced in 1969 but disappointed earlier at the hands of Jackie Oliver and David Hobbs. Dioguardi's best result was 13th at Riverside.

Personal
Dioguardi was born October 12, 1932 in Alia, Sicily. Together with his parents and two brothers the family moved to Los Angeles in 1949. In 1953 the family settled in Glendale, California in 1953. The three brothers ran Dio Brothers Automotive. On May 11, 2015, Dioguardi died in his native Alia.

Car collection
Dioguardi was an avid car collector. The Dioguardi Collectioned was auctioned after he died. The March 86C, chassis number 86C-24, was raced by Josele Garza in the 1986 Indianapolis 500. The car was later raced by Chip Ganassi.

Motorsports results

SCCA National Championship Runoffs

American Open-Wheel racing results
(key) (Races in bold indicate pole position, races in italics indicate fastest race lap)

USAC National Championship

SCCA Grand Prix Championship

Can-Am results

References

1932 births
Italian emigrants to the United States
Racing drivers from California
SCCA National Championship Runoffs winners
Champ Car drivers
Can Am drivers
2015 deaths